This is a list of viceroys and governors of Ava (Inwa) for periods in which it was not the capital of Upper Burma-based kingdoms. This is not a list of monarchs of Ava who ruled from Ava during five separate periods (1365–1555, 1599–1613, 1635–1752, 1765–1783, 1821–1842). The dates after 1582 are on the Gregorian calendar.

List

See also
 List of Burmese monarchs
 List of heirs to the Burmese thrones
 List of rulers of Martaban
 List of rulers of Pegu
 List of rulers of Prome
 List of rulers of Toungoo

Notes

References

Bibliography
 
 
 

Ava